Bunola is an unincorporated community in Allegheny County, Pennsylvania, United States. Bunola has a post office with ZIP code 15020, which opened on May 26, 1888. They had a Volunteer Fire Department  until January 2018; such services have been taken over by the Elizabeth Borough Volunteer Fire Department of Elizabeth, Pennsylvania.       [4]

References

Unincorporated communities in Allegheny County, Pennsylvania
Unincorporated communities in Pennsylvania